Guangxi Tianji (Simplified Chinese: 广西天基) is a Chinese football club its based in Nanning, Guangxi, China.

Name history
2003–2004 Gansu Zhongyou 甘肃众友
2005 Karamay Petroleum 克拉玛依油龙
2006–2007 Guangxi Tianji 广西天基

External links
 http://www.gxtfc.com/

Defunct football clubs in China
Football clubs in China
Association football clubs established in 2003
2003 establishments in China